Indianapolis Monthly is a lifestyle magazine published in Indianapolis, Indiana, U.S. The magazine has some special publications and projects including Indiana Bride, Home, Shops, and Visit Indy's Visitor Guide. It is a member of the City and Regional Magazine Association (CRMA).

History
Founded in 1977, the magazine was called Indianapolis Home and Garden, changing its name in 1980 to Indianapolis at Home. In 1981, Mayhill Publishing took ownership of the magazine, revising its name again to Indianapolis Monthly. Indianapolis-based Emmis Communications purchased the magazine in 1988.

In 2014, Indianapolis Monthly was the recipient of the City and Regional Magazine Association's General Excellence II award.

Emmis sold the magazine to Michigan-based Hour Media Group on December 1, 2022.

References

External links
Official website

1977 establishments in Indiana
Cultural magazines published in the United States
Local interest magazines published in the United States
Magazines established in 1977
Magazines published in Indianapolis
Monthly magazines published in the United States